The 2020 Cork Lower Intermediate Hurling Championship was the inaugural staging of the Cork Lower Intermediate Hurling Championship since its establishment by the Cork County Board. The draw for the group stage placings took place on 19 November 2019. The championship was scheduled to begin in April 2020, however, it was postponed indefinitely due to the coronavirus pandemic in Ireland. The championship eventually began on 1 August 2020 and, after being suspended once again on 5 October 2020, eventually ended on 21 August 2021.

The final was played on 21 August 2021 at Páirc Uí Rinn in Cork, between Castlemartry and Russell Rovers, in what was their first ever meeting in a county final in any grade. Castlemartyr won the match by 1-20 to 0-11 to claim the inaugural title.

Team changes

To Championship 
Regraded from the Cork Intermediate Hurling Championship

 Kilbrittain
 Tracton
 St Finbarrs
 Castlemartyr
 St Catherine’s
 Barryroe
 Ballymartle
 Grenagh
 Ballygarvan
 Milford
 Dripsey

Promoted from the Cork Junior A Hurling Championship

 Russell Rovers

Participating teams

The club rankings were based on a championship performance 'points' system over the previous four seasons.

Fixtures/results

Group 1

Table

Results

Group 2

Table

Results

Group 3

Table

Results

Knockout stage

Relegation playoff

Quarter-finals

Semi-finals

Final

References

External link

 Cork GAA website

Cork Lower Intermediate Hurling Championship